Nerariyum Nerathu is a 1985 Indian Malayalam-language film directed by Salaam Chembazhanthy for Sahrudaya Chithra starring Prem Nazir, Shankar and Ratheesh , supported by T. G. Ravi, Unnimary and Rohini playing other important roles.

Cast 

Prem Nazir as Rajan
Shankar as Rajeev
Ratheesh as SI Mohan
T. G. Ravi as Keshavankutty
Unnimary as Thankamani
Rohini as Rathi
Jagathy Sreekumar as Kuttappan Bhagavathar/Kanishta Raja
Kuthiravattam Pappu as Phalgunan
Bindu Ghosh as Savithri
Lalithasree as Vimala Menon
Anuradha as Dancer
C. I. Paul as Sadanandan
Adoor Bhasi as Bhaskara Kurup
Bahadoor as  Gopala Pilla Master
Madhuri as Sharada

Soundtrack
The music was composed by Johnson and the lyrics were written by Ezhacheri Ramachandran.

References

External links
 

1985 films
1980s Malayalam-language films